"HandClap" is a song recorded by American indie pop band Fitz and the Tantrums. The song was released as the lead single from their self-titled album Fitz and the Tantrums on March 25, 2016, through Elektra Records. It is their highest-charting song on the Billboard Hot 100, peaking at number 53. The song was also included in Playground Games' Forza Horizon 3 soundtrack and Just Dance Unlimited for Just Dance 2017. A rendition of the song was also performed on the South Korean-Japanese survival show Produce 48 in 2018. Since its release, the song has gained popularity from its usage during sporting events. In 2022, this song played in the 9-1-1 episode "Red Flag"

Track listing

Charts

Weekly charts

Year-end charts

Certifications

References

External links 
 

2016 singles
2016 songs
Fitz and The Tantrums songs
Elektra Records singles
Music videos directed by Marc Klasfeld
Dance-pop songs
Songs written by Sam Hollander
Songs written by Ricky Reed